Kim Edwards (born May 4, 1958) is an American author and educator. She was born in Killeen, Texas, grew up in the Finger Lakes region of upstate New York, and graduated from Colgate University and The University of Iowa, where she earned an MFA in fiction and an MA in linguistics. She is the author of a story collection, The Secrets of a Fire King, which was a finalist for the PEN/Hemingway Award; her stories have been published in The Paris Review, Story, Ploughshares, Zoetrope, and many other periodicals.  She has received many awards for the short story as well, including a Pushcart Prize, the National Magazine Award, the Nelson Algren Award, and inclusion in both The Best American Short Stories and the Symphony Space program ‘Selected Shorts.’  She is the recipient of a Whiting Writers’ Award, as well as grants from the Pennsylvania and Kentucky Arts Councils, the Kentucky Foundation for Women, and the National Endowment for the Arts.

The Memory Keeper’s Daughter, her first novel, was a Barnes and Noble Discover Award pick and became a word-of-mouth best-seller, spending 122 consecutive weeks on the New York Times Best Seller list, 20 of those weeks at #1. The Memory Keeper’s Daughter won the Kentucky Literary Award and the British Book Award, and was chosen as Book of the Year for 2006 by USA Today.  Her second novel, The Lake of Dreams, an Independent Booksellers pick, was also an international best seller; her work has been published in more than 32 countries.  Currently, Kim is working on a new novel, as well as a collection of related stories.

Early life and education
Edwards was born in Killeen, Texas. When she was two months old, her family moved to upstate New York, where she was raised.  Edwards began college at Cayuga Community College. She transferred to Colgate University in 1979, and graduated with a bachelor's degree in 1981. In 1983, Edwards received a master's degree from the University of Iowa Writers' Workshop. Edwards earned a second master of arts degree in linguistics, also from the University of Iowa, in 1987.

Career
She wrote the short story collection, The Secrets of a Fire King (1997), which was an alternate for the 1998 PEN/Hemingway Award, and has won both a Whiting Award and the Nelson Algren Award.

Edwards teaches writing at the University of Kentucky.

Edwards' 2005 novel, The Memory Keeper's Daughter, was named the 2006 Book of the Year by USA Today.  Her most recent novel, The Lake of Dreams,  New York Times Bestseller,  was published in January 2011.

Personal life
Edwards married Thomas Clayton in 1987. Edwards and Clayton, who have two daughters together (Abigail and Naomi), reside in Lexington, Kentucky.

Works

Books
 
 "The Great Chain of Being," Originally Published in The Paris Review, Issue 120, Fall 1991

Short stories

References

External links
 University of Kentucky profile
Profile at The Whiting Foundation
 Short Biography by BookBrowse
 The Memory Keeper's Podcast
 Official site for The Memory Keeper's Daughter

Living people
1958 births
Iowa Writers' Workshop alumni
People from Killeen, Texas
Colgate University alumni
American women novelists
21st-century American novelists
Novelists from Texas
Novelists from New York (state)
American women short story writers
21st-century American women writers
21st-century American short story writers